Shi Jun (Pinyin: Shí Jùn; born 9 October 1982 in Dalian, Liaoning) is a Chinese footballer who plays as a striker who currently plays for China League Two side Yunnan Kunlu.

Club career

Early career
At the age of five Shi was encouraged to start playing football by his father and was able to join Dalian Wanda's reserve team at an early age but was not able to hold down a place on the team. At the age of sixteen he would instead go on to join Changchun Yatai and start to playing as a forward. To begin his professional football career he would move to Yunnan Hongta in 2000 and then go on to make his debut in the Jia A in 2002. Injury saw his playing time limited throughout the 2003 league season, however in 2004 Hongta was bought out by Chongqing Lifan and Shi started to get more regular playing time within the first team where he quickly excelled as a forward.

Move to Switzerland
In July 2005, Shi had a successful trial with BSC Young Boys and after a visa delay he would eventually make a permanent move to the Swiss Super League outfit on July 21 and the transfer fee was believed to be around €500,000. He became the first Chinese footballer to play in the Swiss Super League and would make his debut on August 28, 2005, against FC St. Gallen after coming on as a substitute at the 85th minute. After three seasons Shi found it difficult to command a regular first team position and he was loaned out to another Swiss team FC Lucerne during the second half of the 2007/08 league season.

Return to China
Shi moved back to Chinese football with the newly promoted Chengdu Blades where he played in 15 games scoring 4 goals in his debut season. The following season saw Chengdu finish mid-table at the end of the league season, however they were relegated to the second tier for match-fixing. Shi remained with the team despite this to help them push for promotion. Shi transferred to China League Two side Sichuan Dujiangyan Symbol in July 2011. On 21 August, Shi scored 6 goals in a league match which Sichuan beat Hubei Youth 7–0. He scored 13 goals for just half of the 2011 league season which made him the top goal scorer of the league.

Shi moved to China League One side Harbin Yiteng in February 2012.

In March 2016, Shi signed for China League Two club Hebei Elite.

Career statistics
Statistics accurate as of match played 31 December 2020.

Honours
 China League Two top scorer: 2011

References

External links
SHI JUN at soccerway.com
Player stats at sohu.com

1982 births
Living people
Chinese footballers
Footballers from Dalian
Yunnan Hongta players
BSC Young Boys players
Association football forwards
FC Luzern players
Chengdu Tiancheng F.C. players
Zhejiang Yiteng F.C. players
Chinese Super League players
China League One players
Chinese expatriate footballers
China international footballers